This is a list of Number 1 hit singles in 1968 in New Zealand, starting with the first chart dated, 19 January 1968.

Chart

External links
 The Official NZ Music Chart, RIANZ website

1968 in New Zealand
1968 record charts
1968
1960s in New Zealand music